Alexandra Eala (born 23 May 2005) is a Filipino tennis player.

Eala was the No. 2-ranked ITF junior on 6 October 2020. She has a career-high singles ranking by the Women's Tennis Association (WTA) of 214, achieved on 31 October 2022. Eala is the highest-ranked Filipino female singles player in WTA Tour history, surpassing Maricris Gentz, who peaked at No. 284 on 18 October 1999. Eala won her first junior singles title at the 2022 US Open, making her the first Filipino player to win a junior Grand Slam singles title.

Personal life
Her mother Rosemarie "Rizza" Maniego-Eala is a 1985 Southeast Asian Games bronze medalist in the 100-meter backstroke and currently serves as the chief financial officer of Globe Telecom. She is the niece of Philippine Sports Commission chairperson and former Philippine Basketball Association commissioner Noli Eala. Her brother, Michael (Miko), plays tennis for the Pennsylvania State University.
She has been a student of the Rafa Nadal Academy by Movistar in Manacor (Mallorca, Spain), since she was 12 years old.

Junior career
 Junior Grand Slam performance - singles:
 Australian Open: 3R (2020)
 French Open: SF (2020)
 Wimbledon: 2R (2021)
 US Open: W (2022)

 Junior Grand Slam performance - doubles:
 Australian Open: W (2020)
 French Open: W (2021)
 Wimbledon: 2R (2021)
 US Open: SF (2021)

2018
At the age of 12, Eala won the 2018 Les Petit As 14-and-under tournament, beating Linda Nosková in the finals. She made her junior Grand Slam debut at the 2019 US Open. She was named the 2019 Milo Junior Athlete of the Year.

2020: First junior doubles title
Eala won the 2020 Australian girls' doubles event, partnering Priska Madelyn Nugroho. They defeated Živa Falkner and Matilda Mutavdzic in the final.

Eala peaked in the junior rankings at No. 2, after reaching the semifinals at the 2020 French Open girls' singles competition.

2021: Second junior doubles title
Eala paid tribute to her roots on Independence Day following another major triumph, this time on the clay court in Paris. Eala and her Russian partner Oksana Selekhmeteva captured the French Open girls' doubles title Saturday. They were the top seeds in the tournament, won after knocking out Maria Bondarenko of Russia and Amarissa Kiara Tóth of Hungary, 6–0, 7–5, in the final.

2022: First junior Grand Slam singles title
On September 11, 2022, Eala became the first Filipino to win a junior Grand Slam singles championship and the only Filipino with multiple junior Grand Slam titles. She defeated the No. 2 seed, Lucie Havlickova of the Czech Republic, 6–2, 6–4, at the girls' singles final of the 2022 US Open at the USTA Billie Jean King National Tennis Center in New York City.

Professional career

2020: Professional career debut
Eala made her debut on the ITF Women's Circuit on 4 March 2020, as she played in the $15k event at Monastir, where she won her first professional match.

2021: First ITF senior title, top 1000 & WTA debut
She leaped to the top 1000 in the WTA rankings, after winning the title at the first leg of the $15k Manacor event in Spain in January 2021.

She received wildcard in the qualifying draw of 2021 Miami Open – Women's singles where in she lost to Viktória Kužmová in a three set battle in the first round.

Eala made her first ITF doubles final at the $25k Platja d’Aro in Spain, playing with Oksana Selekhmeteva. They lost to Lithuania’s Justina Mikulskyte and Romanian Oana Georgeta Simion, 3-6, 5-7.

In August, she made her WTA Tour main draw debut in 2021 Winners Open in Cluj-Napoca, Romania by receiving a wildcard. On her first match, she defeated Paula Ormaechea in straight sets  7-5, 6-2. On her next match, she lost to Mayar Sherif in straight sets.

2022: Masters 1000 debut
She received a wildcard for her Masters 1000 debut in 2022 Miami Open – Women's singles. She lost to Madison Brengle in the first round in straight sets.

2023: Grand Slam debut
Eala made her debut in the qualifying draw of 2023 Australian Open where in her first match she lost to Misaki Doi in a tight three-setter. Her next appearance was at the Hua Hin Championship, where she would beat Han Xinyun and Kristina Dmitruk in straight sets to reach the main draw. In her first-round match, she would fall to Tatjana Maria.

Performance timeline

Only main-draw results in WTA Tour, Grand Slam tournaments, Fed Cup/Billie Jean King Cup and Olympic Games are included in win–loss records.

Singles
Current after the 2023 Thailand Open.

ITF Circuit finals

Singles 3 (2 titles, 1 runner-up)

Doubles 1 (runner–up)

Junior Grand Slam finals

Singles 1 title

Doubles 2 titles

ITF Junior finals

Singles 9 (4 titles, 5 runner-ups)

Doubles 5 (3 titles, 2 runner-ups)

Notes

References

External links
 
 

Sportspeople from Quezon City
Living people
2005 births
Grand Slam (tennis) champions in girls' doubles
Filipino female tennis players
French Open junior champions
Australian Open (tennis) junior champions
Competitors at the 2021 Southeast Asian Games
Southeast Asian Games bronze medalists for the Philippines
Southeast Asian Games medalists in tennis
Grand Slam (tennis) champions in girls' singles
US Open (tennis) junior champions